Robina Scott Addis,   (1900–1986) was one of the earliest professional psychiatric social workers in Britain.

Addis was not always interested in Social Work. Originally, she read History at the University of Oxford, but after two years she was forced to cut her studies short due to illness. Later, in 1931, Addis decided to go to the London School of Economics where she became interested in the idea of child guidance which led her to apply for their Mental Health Course. She graduated from this in 1933.

After graduating, Addis had a varied career. She started off working in child guidance and then with the National Association for Mental Health (later renamed Mind), from which she retired in 1965. In 1960, she became Deputy General Secretary of Mind and later, in 1979, she founded the Child Guidance Trust in order to pass on her knowledge.

Early life 
Addis was the fourth of the thirteen children of Sir Charles and Lady Addis née Elizabeth Jane McIsaac. She would later cite her numerous siblings, nieces and nephews as a starting point for her interest in child psychology. The family resided at the country estate Woodside in Frant, Sussex.

One of her brothers, Sir John Mansfield Addis, was a diplomat in later life.

Education 
Addis attended the University of Oxford to read History for two years before having to cease her studies due to illness. Nevertheless, she afterwards spent five years working with Professor Charles Waley-Singer cataloguing the alchemical manuscripts of the British Isles. After this period of time and upon deciding that she did not wish to continue working with manuscripts, Addis attended the London School of Economics with the idea of pursuing teaching and child psychology. While attending lectures on child psychology at LSE, Addis was introduced to the study of child guidance and applied to study what was then LSE's Mental Health Course. Due to credits from previous studies at LSE and practical experience before enrolling, Addis was able to skip the normal to year Social Science diploma that was expected from the course. She qualified from this course in 1933.

References

1900 births
1986 deaths
Alumni of the London School of Economics
Officers of the Order of the British Empire
British social workers